Russia women's national beach soccer team represents Russia in international women's beach soccer competitions and is controlled by the Russian Football Federation, the governing body of football in Russia. The team was created in 2018.

The team won the 2018 Women's Euro Beach Soccer Cup in their debut appearance after defeating the teams of Switzerland, Netherlands and Spain.

Current squad
As of August 2021

Head coach: Ilya Leonov
Assistant coach: Ivan Kanaev

Competitive record

Women's Euro Beach Soccer League

Women's Euro Beach Soccer Cup

World Beach Games

Head-to-head records
Includes competitive and friendly matches.

Recent results and upcoming fixtures
Matches played within the last 12 months, as well as upcoming fixtures, are displayed.

See also
Russia men's national beach soccer team

References

External links
Russia at BSWW
Russia at Beach Soccer Russia

European women's national beach soccer teams
Women's national sports teams of Russia